Tapan Banerjee (15 June 1943 – 29 May 2017) was an Indian cricketer. He played eighteen first-class matches for Bengal between 1965 and 1983.

See also
 List of Bengal cricketers

References

External links
 

1943 births
2017 deaths
Indian cricketers
Bengal cricketers
Sportspeople from Kanpur